{{DISPLAYTITLE:C7H9N2O}}
The molecular formula C7H9N2O (molar mass: 137.16 g/mol) may refer to:

 1-Methylnicotinamide, a prototypic organic cation
 Pralidoxime, an oxime

Molecular formulas